Whitewater Creek may refer to:

Whitewater Creek (Colorado), a stream in Colorado
Whitewater Creek (Chattahoochee River tributary), a stream in Georgia
Whitewater Creek (Flint River tributary), a stream in Georgia
Whitewater Creek (South Dakota), a stream in South Dakota
Whitewater Creek (New Mexico), a stream in New Mexico